The William F. and Julia Crome House is a historic house located at 305 South Second Street in Clinton, Henry County, Missouri.

Description and history 
It was built in 1904, and is two-story, American Foursquare style brick dwelling with Colonial Revival style design elements. It has an intersecting hip roof with five dormers and a full-width front porch. Also on the property is a contributing brick garage.

It was listed on the National Register of Historic Places on March 25, 1999.

References

Houses on the National Register of Historic Places in Missouri
Colonial Revival architecture in Missouri
Houses completed in 1904
Buildings and structures in Henry County, Missouri
National Register of Historic Places in Henry County, Missouri
American Foursquare architecture